Smart Energy  is an international, peer-reviewed open-access multi-disciplinary scientific journal focused on energy transition to upcoming smart renewable energy systems. The journal was established in 2021 and is published by Elsevier. The editor-in-chief is Brian Vad Mathiesen (Aalborg University). It is emphasized that efforts to advocate UN's goals of sustainable development are welcomed, specifically "Affordable and clean energy".

Abstracting and indexing
The journal is abstracted and indexed in Scopus, and the Directory of Open Access Journals.

References

External links

Engineering journals
Publications established in 2015
English-language journals
Elsevier academic journals
Creative Commons Attribution-licensed journals
Continuous journals